Megachile ventralis is a species of bee in the family Megachilidae, or "leafcutter bees". It was described by Smith in 1860.

References

Ventralis
Insects described in 1860